Abbas Saad (born 1 December 1967) is a soccer manager and former player who currently manager of National Premier Leagues NSW club Central Coast Mariners Academy. Born in Lebanon, Saad played for the Australia national team.

Club career
Saad began his playing career in 1985 at Sydney City, before moving to Sydney Olympic. In 1990, he was awarded the Joe Marston Medal for the being the Player of the Match in the NSL final in which Sydney Olympic beat the Marconi Stallions 2–0.

He then played in the Malaysian League for Johor and Singapore in the early 1990s. He was a key member of teams which won the League and Malaysia Cup double with both Johor in 1991 and Singapore in 1994.

In the 1994 Malaysia Cup final, Saad scored a hat-trick in Singapore's 4–0 victory over Pahang.

Conviction for match-fixing in Singapore
Shortly after the 1994 triumph, Saad was charged with match-fixing in Singapore. He has always maintained he was innocent of this charge. During his trial, he admitted that he had been approached by his teammate Michal Váňa (a Czech player who was also charged with match-fixing but who jumped bail and left Singapore before he could be tried), who asked Saad to help him win certain matches by large margins during the 1994 season as Váňa was betting on the outcome of the games. However Saad stated that he had refused to help Váňa try to fix the scores of any games, and had merely told Váňa that he would try to help the Singapore team win the games by as many goals as possible as this was his job. Saad had not reported Váňa's requests or his knowledge that Váňa was betting on games to team officials or the authorities, but stated during his trial that he had told Váňa that he should stop betting on matches.

In June 1995, the Singapore courts convicted Saad of match-fixing and fined him S$50,000. He then received a global playing ban from FIFA.

Saad continues to maintain that he was innocent of match-fixing, and that he merely knew that Váňa was betting on the outcomes of matches but was not involved himself. Speaking about the verdict in an interview in 2009, Saad said: "(Váňa) approached me once and said 'you score goals?' and I said 'of course I score goals, I'm a striker'. And so that conversation was taken out of context. There was no money received or nothing like that. I don't know how they built a case, I think it was a technical thing. I'm not a lawyer."

Resumption to playing career
After his ban ended, Saad played for several teams in the National Soccer League in Australia – Sydney Olympic in 1996–97, Sydney United from 1997–99, and for Northern Spirit FC in the 1999–00 season.

International career
Born in Lebanon, Saad's family moved to Australia when he was a child. An attacking midfielder with a good eye for goal, he represented the Australian national team in a match against Russian club Torpedo Moscow and earned his first full cap against Malaysia two years later. After a six-year gap, he was recalled by then Socceroos coach Terry Venables for three games in 1998. In all, he played six times for his country, earning four full caps.

Coaching career
Saad was coach at New South Wales Premier League side Penrith Nepean United, and in 2009 was named as Technical Youth Director by Sydney Olympic FC. He has also been the head coach for the Australian Deaf Football team. Saad has also served as the head coach of the GIS Academy at the Garden International School in Kuala Lumpur, Malaysia who unfortunately lost in the ISAC division 2 finals against fierce rivals KLASS. With Goals from Eamon and Connor as well as saves from Alex proving to be the decisive factors.

Following his conviction for match-fixing in Singapore, he received a lifetime ban from the Football Association of Singapore, but this was lifted in 2009 and he is now able to be involved in footballing activities in Singapore again.

Broadcasting career
Saad's football ban in Singapore was only lifted in March 2009 after almost 14 years. In August 2009, he began appearing as a football expert in the studios of ESPN STAR Sports and for the SingTel coverage of the UEFA Champions League in Singapore, where his popularity once saw him dubbed as "The Singapore Beckham". He is also a regular studio guest for the English Premier League coverage and the FourFourTwo TV Show with the SuperSport channel on Malaysian network, Astro.

References

External links
Abbas Saad at Aussie Footballers
Abbas Saad expat profile

Australian soccer players
Australia international soccer players
Australian expatriate soccer players
Lebanese emigrants to Australia
Sportspeople of Lebanese descent
Expatriate footballers in Malaysia
Expatriate footballers in Qatar
APIA Leichhardt FC players
Sydney Olympic FC players
Sydney United 58 FC players
Northern Spirit FC players
Sydney Olympic FC managers
Singapore FA players
Al Sadd SC players
Hakoah Sydney City East FC players
1967 births
Living people
Association football midfielders
Qatar Stars League players
People from Baalbek
Sportsmen from New South Wales
Australian expatriate sportspeople in Malaysia
Australian expatriate sportspeople in Qatar
Soccer players from Sydney